David Walls may refer to:

David Walls (academic) (born 1941), professor emeritus of sociology at Sonoma State University, USA
Ginger Wildheart (born 1964), British musician and singer (born David Walls) with the band The Wildhearts
Dave Walls (born 1977), American sports anchor and reporter

See also
David Wall (disambiguation)